muru-D is an Australian startup accelerator founded in 2013. It is backed by the Australian telecommunications company Telstra. To date, over 44 startups have been through the program, with 42 still in operation.

muru-D, stylised with a lowercase 'm', is derived from the Sydney Aboriginal Eora word ‘Muru’, meaning ‘path’, and 'D' standing for digital: ‘path to digital.'
muru-D is currently based in 3 locations (Sydney, Singapore and Melbourne), with partner programs in Perth at Spacecubed and Brisbane at River City Labs. They also have space in Telstra's San Francisco office, providing alumni with US customer and investor connections.

History
muru-D was founded by Annie Parker and Mick Liubinkas in October 2013 after Telstra recognised that it needed to be more involved in the tech startup scene. It was officially opened by former Prime Minister of Australia, Malcolm Turnbull.

In 2015, muru-D expanded operations to Singapore due to its "fast-developing start-up ecosystem, pro-business policies and access to local capital."

At the end of 2016, Annie Parker left muru-D and was replaced by ex-Salesforce executive, Julie Trell.

In 2017, muru-D altered its funding model to be more founder friendly and attract later-stage startups. It also launched its new IoT themed space in Melbourne, based at Telstra's Gurrowa Labs.

References

Companies based in Sydney
Australian companies established in 2013